Äripäev (Estonian for "Business Day") is an Estonian financial newspaper in tabloid format. It was founded in 1989 by Dagens Industri, a leading Swedish financial newspaper. The first issue of Äripäev was published on 9 October 1989. Until May 1992 Äripäev was published once a week, until February 1996 three times a week. Since 1996 Äripäev has been published five times a week.

The newspaper belongs to AS Äripäev, which is owned by the Swedish family-owned media group Bonnier.

English-language section is called Baltic Business News (BBN). And this section is cooperation of three economic newspapers from Baltic states: Äripäev (Estonia), Dienas Bizness (Latvia) and Verslo žinios (Lithuania).

References

External links
 
Business news from Baltic States 

1989 establishments in Estonia
Bonnier Group
Business newspapers
Estonian-language newspapers
Mass media in Tallinn
Newspapers established in 1989
Newspapers published in Estonia